Melford Homela (born 3 June 1970) is a retired Zimbabwean who competed in middle-distance events. He represented his country at the 1988 and 1992 Summer Olympics. He also won the bronze medal at the 1988 World Junior Championships.

His personal bests are 1:47.36 in the 800 metres (Seoul 1988) and 3:47.38 in the 1500 metres (Seoul 1988).

International competitions

References

External links
All-Athletics profile

Living people
1970 births
Zimbabwean male middle-distance runners
Athletes (track and field) at the 1988 Summer Olympics
Athletes (track and field) at the 1990 Commonwealth Games
Athletes (track and field) at the 1992 Summer Olympics
Commonwealth Games competitors for Zimbabwe
Olympic athletes of Zimbabwe
Riverside City College alumni